This is a list of historic buildings in Klamath Falls, Oregon, many of which are located downtown.

Nineteenth century

1900-1910

1911-1919

1920-1929

1930-1939

1940-1949

Dates Unknown

Demolished

See also

 National Register of Historic Places listings in Klamath County, Oregon

References

Klamath